Varina Commercial Historic District is a national historic district located at Fuquay-Varina, Wake County, North Carolina.  The district encompasses 12 contributing buildings in the central business district of Fuquay-Varina.  The district developed between about 1899 and 1926, and includes notable examples of early-20th century commercial architecture.  Notable buildings include the Union Station (c. 1910), Varina Hotel (c. 1925), Bank of Varina (c. 1914), Varina Garage and Machine Company Building (c. 1918), Drug Store (c. 1917), and Bank of Varina (1926).

It was listed on the National Register of Historic Places in 1990.

References

Commercial buildings on the National Register of Historic Places in North Carolina
Historic districts on the National Register of Historic Places in North Carolina
Buildings and structures in Wake County, North Carolina
National Register of Historic Places in Wake County, North Carolina